Larne Town railway station serves Larne in County Antrim, Northern Ireland. The original station was opened on 1 October 1862, and was demolished in 1974 to make way for the current station.

Service

Some of those peak services start and terminate here rather than Larne Harbour.

On Sundays there is a service every two hours in either direction to Larne Harbour or Great Victoria Street.

References

Railway stations in County Antrim
Railway stations opened in 1862
Railway stations served by NI Railways
Buildings and structures in Larne
Transport in Larne
1862 establishments in Ireland
Railway stations in Northern Ireland opened in the 19th century